Walter Frank Foy (31 December 1908 – 2 December 1993) was a Liberal party member of the House of Commons of Canada. He was born in Peterborough, Ontario, and became a life underwriter by career.

He was first elected at the Lambton West riding in the 1962 general election, then re-elected there in 1963 and 1965. In 1968, Foy left federal politics after completing his term in the 27th Canadian Parliament and did not seek further re-election.

External links
 

1908 births
1993 deaths
Liberal Party of Canada MPs
Members of the House of Commons of Canada from Ontario
People from Peterborough, Ontario